Arth-Goldau RB railway station is a railway station in the municipality of Arth, in the Swiss canton of Schwyz. It is the terminus of the standard gauge Arth–Rigi line of Rigi Railways. The station consists of an elevated platform above the mainline Arth-Goldau station of Swiss Federal Railways.

Services 
 the following services stop at Arth-Goldau RB:

References

External links 
 
 

Railway stations in the canton of Schwyz
Rigi Railways stations